This Country is a British mockumentary sitcom, first broadcast in the United Kingdom on BBC Three on 8 February 2017. Created by, written by and starring siblings Daisy May Cooper and Charlie Cooper and directed by Tom George, the series focusses on the day-to-day lives of two cousins living in a small village in the Cotswolds. The programme includes themes of social clumsiness, the trivialities of human behaviour, the eccentricities of living in rural England, and the boredom and social isolation of young people in small communities.

The Coopers play the central characters, cousins Kerry and Lee "Kurtan" Mucklowe. Much of the series revolves around their unlikely friendship with the local vicar, Rev. Francis Seaton, played by Paul Chahidi. The Coopers’ father, Paul Cooper, plays Kerry's father Martin Mucklowe, while their uncle, Trevor Cooper, plays local man and antagonist Len Clifton. Although credited to "Ivy Woodcock", the voice of Sue Mucklowe — Kerry's mother, never seen on screen—is provided by Daisy May.

Across the three series and the special, This Country received over 52 million BBC iPlayer requests.

Cast

Main cast
Daisy May Cooper as Kerry Mucklowe. Kerry is the main character, a young woman roughly in her early twenties. She lives with her mother, Sue, who is never seen (also voiced by Cooper, she communicates with Kerry by yelling at her from her bedroom). Due to the limited opportunities and mundanity in the rural area where she lives, she is nihilistic and lacking in self-purpose, frequently finding herself with very little to do other than spend time with her cousin, Kurtan, with whom she engages in absent-minded mischief and occasionally antisocial behaviour. Kerry often struggles to put other people before herself and this is demonstrated in Episode 1 of series 2 "Random Acts of Kindness" where she donates a PS3 to Slugs as a goodwill gesture, then immediately requests it back after Slugs doesn't show the level of gratitude that she wanted.  She tends to see herself as a figure of authority in the village with "enemies" in nearby villages. In reality, no one sees her this way because she often shies away from confrontation, and her attempts to present herself as tough and authoritative are usually met with mockery or her being accused of acting up in front of the cameras. Throughout the series, more details are revealed about Kerry's difficult family situation which have undoubtedly had an influence on her behaviour and character. In particular, she meets somebody in her father's former biker gang who recounts an discomforting story about how he met her mother.
Charlie Cooper as Lee "Kurtan" Mucklowe, Kerry's cousin. Although equally as bored as his cousin Kerry, Kurtan tends to have slightly more ambition in life and has plans to leave the village in order to fulfil it, albeit these are usually ill-fated. He is also reasonably more sensitive and considerate to other people than Kerry. However, he is often cynical and paranoid, and as much as he tries to rise above Kerry's immaturity, he is sometimes not much better and often still finds himself in petty arguments with her. He lives with his grandma, whom Kerry despises.

Supporting cast
Paul Chahidi as the Rev. Francis Seaton, the parish vicar. Kind-hearted Rev. Seaton is responsible for most of the events that bring the village community together. He is also something of a father figure and mentor to Kerry and Kurtan, filling the role that Kerry's parents have failed to provide by assisting them in times of need and encouraging them to be good people, which is not always met with compliance. While Kerry and Kurtan make a mockery of him for some of his old-fashioned tastes and his Christian do-gooder persona, this is done with good intentions as they are generally very fond of him as he has their interests at heart more than anyone else in the community. His role as vicar requires him be a friend to everyone in the community, and he is always happy to lend an ear to anyone, though when conflicts do arise this puts him in difficult positions which he struggles to manage.
Michael Sleggs as Michael "Slugs" Slugette (series 1–2). A quiet young man who has terminal cancer. Despite his tragic circumstances, Kerry and Kurtan show no interest in being friends with him because he is "annoying" and do their utmost to avoid becoming too friendly with him.
Paul Cooper as Martin Mucklowe, Kerry's estranged father. Although Kerry thinks the world of her dad, he is shown to be a selfish and narcissistic man who does not reciprocate her fondness for him at all, and any attention he pays towards her is motivated only by self-interests. Much to the protests of others who all see him as the man he is, Kerry continues time and again to give Martin the benefit of the doubt, even after his attempts to manipulate her into handing herself in for stealing vacuum cleaners, a crime which he himself perpetrated but set Kerry up for. He has fathered two other children, Martin and Marvin, with Sandra.
Ashley McGuire as Mandy Harris. Known as 'Big Mandy' to some, she is a woman in the village who has a thuggish, rough-looking appearance and a somewhat unsettling presence. As a result of this, she is the only person in the village that Kerry and Kurtan genuinely find intimidating, though it is never certain as to whether she intends to be a bully to people or is in fact just misunderstood as being as such. She has a brash manner of speaking and tells anecdotes in which she has committed acts of violence or other forms of crime, such as the time she stalked Hannah Spearritt from S Club 7 for three or four years. Though Kerry and Kurtain are conflicted as to whether they believe anything she says, this nonetheless gives her the air of a criminal which causes them to label her a 'psychopath'. She often pursues creative endeavours, such as becoming a tattoo artist and joining the village book club to showcase her creative writing skills, but her efforts are often laughably poor as she is shown to possess very little creative talent.

Recurring cast
Trevor Cooper as Len Clifton
Daisy May Cooper (credited as Ivy Woodcock) as Sue Mucklowe (voice only)
Eliza Hunt as June Winwood (series 1, 3)
Celeste Dring as Kayleigh Hudson
Badger Skelton as Levi Johnson	(series 1)
David Hargreaves as Arthur Andrews (series 2–3)

Guest cast
Matthew Rees as Robert Robinson (series 1)
Preston Nyman as "Weak" Nathan Kay (series 1)
Laura Checkley as Shaz Gallagher (series 1)
David Nightingale as Steve "Nugget" Nuggins, Kerry's uncle	(series 1)
Alfie Simmons as Neil "Count Fartula" Pedley (series 1)
Liam Steward-George as PC Webber (series 1–2)
Jimmy Walker as Dan Greaves (series 2–3)
Gerran Howell as Jacob Seaton, the Vicar's son (series 2)

Production
The series was filmed on location in and around the small town of Northleach, Gloucestershire. Daisy Cooper said: "All the material is based around stuff that happens in Cirencester, but when we went to the channel they thought that Cirencester was a bit too big and Northleach is a smaller village, and sort of isolates the characters a bit more. Makes them more claustrophobic." The location used for exterior shots of Kerry's house is at 16 Fortey Road, Northleach.

Filming for series 1 commenced in September 2016, and was completed within three weeks. A second series was quickly confirmed, with filming taking place over the summer of 2017 and its first episode released on 26 February 2018. A one-off special episode, forming an epilogue to the second series, was filmed over the summer of 2018, and broadcast in October that year.

On 30 May 2019, actor Michael Sleggs—who played Michael "Slugs" Slugette—announced he was terminally ill and had not long to live. He died on 9 July 2019. Series 3 began production in August 2019. Production was completed by October 2019 and aired from February to March 2020.

Episodes
</onlyinclude>

Series 1 (2017)

Series 2 (2018)

Special (2018)

Series 3 (2020)

Reception
This Country received positive reviews from critics. Stuart Heritage, for The Guardian, described it as a "perfectly observed" comedy, and wrote: "I found myself rewinding entire scenes because I was too busy howling with laughter to hear what was going on." Sean O'Grady, for The Independent, wrote: "It isn't very often that I am able to recommend something because it made me weep tears of laughter, but I am happy and heartened to say that the latest BBC mockumentary, This Country, is sublime enough to have lifted my spirits heavenwards... [It has] an uneasily well-observed quality that raises the comedic genre almost to an art form." Rupert Hawksley, for The Daily Telegraph, wrote: "It is, by some distance, the funniest thing on television at the moment." Mike McCahill, for Reader's Digest, described the programme as an "increasingly cherishable mockumentary" and essential viewing, observing that "[the] Coopers have created an entire universe in a handful of episodes." Arts critic Bruce Dessau concluded: "It might have well-used stylistic elements of both The Office and People Just Do Nothing about it, but it is sharply-written and deftly performed [and] stays just on the right side of cliché. And most importantly both Kerry and Lee are richly comic."

Awards

Home video releases
All three series of This Country and the Aftermath Special have been released in Regions 2 both individually and in box sets.

Adaptation

An American version of the series was announced by Fox. On 30 January 2020, it was announced that the production had been given a pilot order. On 24 February 2020, Seann William Scott was cast in main role for the pilot. On 4 March 2020, Chelsea Holmes, Sam Straley, Taylor Ortega and Krystal Smith were cast in main roles for the pilot. On 10 July 2020, Aya Cash and Justin Linville were cast in main roles for the pilot. On 30 October 2020, it was announced that the production had been given a series order and is scheduled for premiere in the 2021–22 television season. The series will be a co-production between Lionsgate Television, Fox Entertainment, Feigco Entertainment and BBC Studios with Jenny Bicks as writer and executive producer and Paul Feig as director and executive producer. On 4 December 2020, Desmin Borges joined the cast in recurring role. On 30 December 2020, Jason MacDonald joined the cast in a recurring role. On 17 May 2021, it was announced that the series title had been changed from This Country  to Welcome to Flatch.

Books
On 3 October 2019, an official hardback book was released, entitled This Is This Country: The official book of the BAFTA award-winning show, published by Trapeze Books.

References

External links
 
 
 
 
A Board Game for Nit Wits inspired by This Country

2017 British television series debuts
2020 British television series endings
2010s British sitcoms
2020s British sitcoms
BBC television sitcoms
British mockumentary television series
English-language television shows
Television series about cousins
Television series about dysfunctional families
Television shows set in Gloucestershire
Television series by BBC Studios
BAFTA winners (television series)